Naomi Safran-Hon (born 1984 Oxford, UK) is an Israeli artist living and working in Brooklyn. She creates paintings that combine cement, lace, acrylic, and photographs.

Biography
Naomi Safran-Hon was born in Oxford, England, and grew up in Haifa, Israel. She received a Bachelor of Arts degree summa cum laude from Brandeis University in 2008, in Studio Art and Art History, and a Masters of Fine Arts degree from Yale University School of Art in 2010. She is also a 2012 The Skowhegan School of Art residency alumnus.

Safran-Hon's recent work combines photographs of the dilapidated neighborhood of Wadi Salib in her hometown of Haifa with cement and lace, and uses an impressionist style to transform these images into mixed-media paintings. Her work investigates the concepts of home, domesticity, war, and displacement and is intrinsically tied to the Israeli-Palestinian Conflict.
She received the Young Artist Award from the Hecht Museum at the University of Haifa, and in 2012 was chosen as one of five winning artists to exhibit at the Brooklyn Museum.

Safran-Hon has shown work in exhibitions including “Salmat Beton va-Melet Gown of Concrete and Cement” at the Brandt Gallery in Amsterdam and "Faux Sho" at the Islip Art Museum.

Safran-Hon's work is represented by Slag Gallery in Brooklyn.

References

https://www.nytimes.com/2020/05/15/arts/design/naomi-safran-han.html

External links
Salon Article: Cement and lace paintings uncover political conflicts
Volta NY listing
Go Brooklyn Art Studio visit
Personal Website
Interview with America-Israel Cultural Foundation
Naomi Safran-Hon Gallery

Israeli women artists
Israeli women photographers
Israeli photographers
1984 births
Living people
Skowhegan School of Painting and Sculpture alumni